Mersevát is a village in Vas county, Hungary.

History
Mersevát was created in 1906 with the unification of two small villages, named Merse and Belsővat.

Notable people
József Tóth (1929–2017), footballer

References

External links

 Kemenesvidek website: Mersevát 

Populated places in Vas County